One Big Hapa Family is a 2010 live-action/animated documentary film directed by Canadian director Jeff Chiba Stearns. The documentary explores aspects that influence most Japanese-Canadians to marry inter-racially and how the mixed Japanese generation perceives its multiracial identity.

Awards and nominations

Awards
2010 NFB Best Canadian Film and Video Award: Toronto Reel Asian International Film Festival
2010 Closing Night Film: Vancouver Asian Film Festival
2011 Opening Night Film: DisOrient Asian American Film Festival of Oregon
2011 Best Documentary Award: Trail Dance Film Festival
2011 Opening Night Film: AmérAsia International Film Festival
2011 Closing Film: Mixed Roots Film and Literary Festival
2011 Rising Star Award – Documentary Competition: Canada Film Festival
2011 Edith Lando Peace Prize: Reel 2 Real International Film Festival for Youth
2011 Special Jury Award, Documentary: Outstanding Cinematography: Los Angeles Asian Pacific Film Festival
2011 Special Jury Award, Documentary: Outstanding Editing: Los Angeles Asian Pacific Film Festival
2011 Best Film Featuring a Person with a Mixed Background: Mixed Roots Film and Literary Festival 2011
2011 Best Historically Accurate Depiction of the Mixed Experience: Mixed Roots Film and Literary Festival 2011

Nominations
2011 Nominated for Best Multicultural: Yorkton Film Festival
2011 Nominated for Best Short Documentary Program: Leo Awards 2011
2011 Nominated for Best Screenwriting in a Documentary Program or Series: Leo Awards 2011
2011 Nominated for Best Picture Editing in a Documentary Program or Series: Leo Awards 2011
2011 Nominated for Best Musical Score in a Documentary Program or Series: Leo Awards 2011

References

External links 
 

2010 animated films
2010 films
2010 documentary films
Canadian animated documentary films
Films about Japanese Canadians
Documentary films about race and ethnicity
2010s English-language films
2010s Canadian films